Robert Melvin (Mickey) Channell, Jr. (September 9, 1942 – February 26, 2019) was an American politician from Georgia. Channell was a Republican member of the Georgia House of Representatives from the 165th District from 1992 to 2015.

During his 22 years in the Georgia General Assembly, Channell served as Chairman of the House Ways and Means Committee, Vice-Chairman of Appropriations, Chairman of the Health Subcommittee of Appropriations, Chairman of Industrial Relations and Secretary of Transportation. He also served on Health and Human Services, Human Relations and Aging, and Rules. Considered an expert on healthcare in Georgia, Channell’s proudest achievement in the Georgia General Assembly was authoring the PeachCare for Kids legislation, securing affordable healthcare services for children of Georgia’s working families. A supporter of rural hospitals, Mr. Channell played a significant role in making it possible for St. Mary’s Good Samaritan Hospital to locate in Greene County.  He was named Legislator of the Year by James Magazine in 2014 and one of Georgia Trend’s 100 Most Influential Georgians in 2014, in addition to numerous other honors and awards during his political career.

Channell died on February 26, 2019.

References

1942 births
2019 deaths
Members of the Georgia House of Representatives
Georgia (U.S. state) Republicans
People from Washington, Georgia
Georgia (U.S. state) Democrats
21st-century American politicians